Arthur Edward Spence Hill (1 August 1922 – 22 October 2006) was a Canadian actor. He was known in British and American theatre, film and television.

Early life
Arthur Hill was born Arthur Edward Spence Hill in Melfort, Saskatchewan, on 1 August 1922, the son of Edith Georgina (Spence) and Olin Drake Hill, a lawyer. As part of the Royal Canadian Air Force during World War II, Hill served in the mechanic corps. He attended the University of British Columbia, studying law. He joined the RCAF while in UBC pre-law. After the war, finishing the university degree, he was lured to the stage. He studied acting in Seattle, Washington.

Career
Hill's Broadway theatre debut was in the 1957 revival of Thornton Wilder's The Matchmaker, playing Cornelius Hackl. In 1963, the Tonys awarded Hill Best Dramatic Actor for his portrayal of George in the original Broadway production of Who's Afraid of Virginia Woolf? Other Broadway credits include: Ben Gant in the original production of Look Homeward, Angel (1957); All the Way Home (1960); Something More! (1964); and More Stately Mansions (1967).

In the film The Andromeda Strain (1971), Hill played Dr. Jeremy Stone. Other film work: The Ugly American (1963); Harper (1966); Petulia (1968); The Chairman (1969); The Killer Elite (1975); Futureworld (1976); A Bridge Too Far (1977) (uncredited); and narration of Something Wicked This Way Comes (1983).

Hill's television role portraying lawyer Owen Marshall in the 1971–74 TV series Owen Marshall, Counselor at Law had high status at the time. He appeared on many other television shows, including The Reporter, a 1964 drama starring Harry Guardino. Grandpa Lansford Ingalls on Little House on the Prairie (1976) was another of Hill's portrayals.

Other television shows were: Mission Impossible, episode "The Carriers" (S1:E10) 1966; Voyage to the Bottom of the Sea, episode "The Monster from the Inferno" 1966; The F.B.I., (S1:E23) "Flight to Harbin" 1966; The Invaders, episode "The Leeches" 1967; Murder, She Wrote, the pilot episode, 1984, reprising the role in 1990; and Columbo, episode "Agenda for Murder", portraying a governor, was his final role in 1990.

Personal life 
Hill married Peggy Hassard in September 1942. Their children were Douglas and Jennifer. The family moved to Great Britain in 1948. In London, he was at the BBC, both radio and television. They moved to New York City in 1958, then to Los Angeles in 1968.

He retired in 1990. After the death of his wife in 1998, he married Anne-Sophie Taraba in 2001.

Death
Hill died on 22 October 2006, in Pacific Palisades, California. He lived in a nursing home, and was 84 years old. His passing was attributed to Alzheimer's disease.

Selected filmography

 I Was a Male War Bride (1949) as Dependents Clearing Officer (uncredited)
 Miss Pilgrim's Progress (1949) as American Vice-Consul (uncredited)
 The Body Said No! (1950) as Robin King
 Mister Drake's Duck (1951) as American Vice Consul
 Scarlet Thread (1951) as Shaw
 Salute the Toff (1952) as Ted Harrison
 You're Only Young Twice (1952) as Mystery Man (uncredited)
 Penny Princess (1952) as Representative of Johnson K. Johnson (uncredited)
 Paul Temple Returns (1952) as Cranmer Guest
 A Day to Remember (1953) as Al
 Life with the Lyons (1954) as Slim Cassidy
 The Crowded Day (1954) as Alice's Escort
 Raising a Riot (1955) as American Sergeant (uncredited)
 The Deep Blue Sea (1955) as Jackie Jackson
 [[Colonel March of Scotland Yard (S01:E17)|The Silver Curtain]] (1955) as Jerry Winton
 The Young Doctors (1961) as Tomaselli
 The Ugly American (1963) as Grainger 
 In the Cool of the Day (1963) as Sam Bonner
 Moment to Moment (1965) as Neil Stanton
 Harper (1966) as Albert Graves
 Petulia (1968) as Barney
 The Chairman (1969) as Shelby
 Don't Let the Angels Fall (1969) as Robert
 Rabbit, Run (1970) as Rev. Jack Eccles
 The Pursuit of Happiness (1971) as John Popper
 The Andromeda Strain (1971) as Dr. Jeremy Stone
 The Killer Elite (1975) as Cap Collis
 Futureworld (1976) as Duffy
 A Bridge Too Far (1977) as U.S. Medical Colonel (uncredited)
 The Champ (1979) as Mike
 A Little Romance (1979) as Richard King
 Butch and Sundance: The Early Days (1979) as Governor (uncredited)
 The Ordeal of Dr. Mudd (1980) as Thomas Ewing Jr.
 Revenge of the Stepford Wives (1980) as Dale 'Diz' Corbett
 Dirty Tricks (1981) as Professor Prosser
 The Amateur (1981) as Brewer
 Making Love (1982) as Henry
 Something Wicked This Way Comes (1983) as Narrator (voice)
 Murder in Space (1985) as Vice President
 One Magic Christmas (1985) as Caleb Grainger
 A Fine Mess'' (1986) (uncredited)

References

External links

 
 

1922 births
2006 deaths
Canadian male film actors
Canadian male stage actors
Canadian male television actors
Deaths from Alzheimer's disease
Deaths from dementia in California
Tony Award winners
People from Melfort, Saskatchewan
Male actors from Saskatchewan
University of British Columbia alumni
Canadian expatriate male actors in the United States
Royal Canadian Air Force personnel of World War II
Royal Canadian Air Force airmen